Erfjord Church is a parish church of the Church of Norway in Suldal Municipality in Rogaland county, Norway. It is located in the village of Hålandsosen. It is the church for the Erfjord parish which is part of the Ryfylke prosti (deanery) in the Diocese of Stavanger. The white, wooden church was built in a long church design in 1877 using designs by the architect T. Tengesdal. The church seats about 180 people.

See also
List of churches in Rogaland

References

Suldal
Churches in Rogaland
Wooden churches in Norway
19th-century Church of Norway church buildings
Churches completed in 1877
1877 establishments in Norway